John Alfred Twigg (1882– 1957) was an English association footballer who played as a forward.

Born in Ashby-de-la-Zouch, Leicestershire, Twigg began his footballing career with Burton Albion. He also played for Hinckley Town, Gainsborough Trinity and Millwall where he played from the 1905 to 1910. Twigg is Millwall's 5th all-time leading scorer, with 88 goals. He was top scorer for the Lions in the Southern League three seasons in a row, scoring 28 goals in 1906–07, 30 in 1907–08 and 17 in the 1908–09 season. Twigg holds the record for the highest number of goals between London rivals, Millwall and West Ham United. Twigg scored 10 goals against West Ham, his first on 16 April 1906 and his last on 26 April 1909.

References

People from Ashby-de-la-Zouch
Footballers from Leicestershire
English footballers
Association football forwards
Millwall F.C. players
1882 births
1957 deaths
Burton Albion F.C. players
Gainsborough Trinity F.C. players
Hinckley Town F.C. players
Place of death missing
Southern Football League players